Masamune Datenicle is a Japanese anime series produced through the cooperation of the anime studio Gaina and the city of Date, Fukushima. It is one of a number of anime produced by Gaina in promotion of Fukushima Prefecture. Otherwise known as Masamune Date ni Kuru, the anime references not only the word "chronicle" in its title, but also the Japanese phrase "come to Date."

Plot 
The series follows a young Date Masamune as he prepares for his first battle. Upon praying at the Date family shrine, Masamune is met by a dragon deity that bestows him with a jewel granting him the power to summon former leaders of the Date Clan to help him on his journey.

Characters 
, voiced by: Ayumu Murase
, voiced by: Yūsuke Kobayashi
, voiced by: Sōichirō Hoshi
, voiced by: Sarah Emi Birdcutt
, voiced by: Toshiyuki Morikawa
, voiced by: 
, voiced by: 
, voiced by: Naomi Shindō
, voiced by: Rikako Yamaguchi
, voiced by: Toshiki Masuda
, voiced by: Kaito Ishikawa
, voiced by: Yūichirō Umehara
, voiced by: 
, voiced by: KENN
, voiced by: Yoshitsugu Matsuoka
, voiced by: Daiki Yamashita
, voiced by: 
, voiced by: Yūma Uchida
, voiced by: 
, voiced by:

Reception 
Masamune Datenicle was included in the 2019 edition of the 88 Japanese Anime Spots by the anime tourism association.

References

External links 
  
 

Cultural depictions of Date Masamune